General Population is the debut album of German hip-hop group C-Block, released by Maad Records and WEA in 1997. Recording sessions for the album took place during 1995 and 1996 in Germany. The album was primarily produced by the group's creators, Frank Müller, Ulrich Buchmann and Jörg Wagner. The album experienced a significant amount of commercial success and sales for a hip hop record at the time. One of the album's songs, "So Strung Out", was released as a single earlier, on 4 October 1996 and reached fourth chart position in Germany.

General Population was both a critical and commercial success.

Track listing

Chart

Weekly charts

Year-end charts

References

C-Block albums
1997 albums